Sand Canyon Wash is an approximately  (to its longest source) tributary of San Diego Creek in Orange County, southern California.

Course
Its headwaters rise in the northern San Joaquin Hills as two streams, Shady Canyon Creek and Bommer Canyon Creek, then flows northwest into Sand Canyon Reservoir, formed by a dam across Strawberry Valley east of the community of Turtle Rock near Irvine. The dry creek bed continues northwest from the reservoir, turning west where it enters the city of Irvine, flowing along the northeastern boundary of William R. Mason Regional Park.

See also
San Diego Creek bicycle path

References

Rivers of Orange County, California
San Joaquin Hills
Irvine, California
Rivers of Southern California